Shivpuri, also spelled Shiupuri, is a village in Bakshi Ka Talab block of Lucknow district, Uttar Pradesh, India. As of 2011, its population is 3,747, in 648 households. It is the seat of a gram panchayat, which also includes the village of Bhikhampur.

References 

Villages in Lucknow district